Tezosentan is a non-selective ETA and ETB receptor antagonist. It acts as a vasodilator and was designed by Actelion as a therapy for patients with acute heart failure.  However, studies showed that tezosentan did not improve dyspnea or reduce the risk of fatal or nonfatal cardiovascular events.

References 

Vasodilators
Tetrazoles
Pyridines
Pyrimidines
Phenol ethers
Sulfonamides
Alcohols
Endothelin receptor antagonists
Isopropyl compounds
Diaryl ethers